The Time Traveler's Wife may also refer to:

 The Time Traveler's Wife - a 2003 novel
 The Time Traveler's Wife (film) - 2009 film adaptation
 The Time Traveler's Wife (TV series) - 2022 TV adaptation